The Hit Factory Volume 3 is a compilation album collecting the biggest hits of the award-winning British music production trio Stock Aitken Waterman during their most successful era. It was released by PWL Records in association with Fanfare Records in June 1989 and reached #3 in the compilation Top 20, achieving a Gold BPI award.

Some critics highlighted the negative aspects of the release: it contained 2 B Sides ("Made in Heaven" and "Wrap My Arms Around You"), 5 cover versions ("Turn It Into Love", "Help!", "I Only Wanna Be With You", "I Haven't Stopped Dancing Yet" and "Ferry 'Cross the Mersey"), a major flop ("S.S. Paparazzi") and the remaining 3 tracks were considered weak songs ("Take Me To Your Heart", "I'd Rather Jack" and "He Ain't No Competition") although they all reached the UK Top 10. Kylie Minogue and Jason Donovan's duet "Especially for You" was however one of the biggest selling singles of the 1980s.

Stock Aitken Watermans' success peaked during 1988 and 1989 and at the time of this album's release, reviewers were quick to highlight any short-comings with any release associated with the trio. Nevertheless, the popularity of this compilation is evident and it is distinct in that it contained a bonus LP/CD megamix of the albums' more dance orientated material.

Exclused from the compilation is "This Time I Know It's for Real" by Donna Summer, a number three hit for Summer in collaboration with SAW in March 1989, three months before the release of this title.

Track listings
UK Track listing (2xCD/LP: UK Fanfare/PWL HFCD/LP 8) (Video: VHF8)

Disc one
Take Me to Your Heart : Rick Astley
I'd Rather Jack : The Reynolds Girls
Made in Heaven : Kylie Minogue (B Side to "Je Ne Sais Pas Pourquoi")
Turn It Into Love : Hazell Dean (Originally recorded by Kylie Minogue)
Help! : Bananarama & Lananeeneenoonoo (Originally recorded by The Beatles)
Especially for You : Kylie & Jason
He Ain't No Competition : Brother Beyond
I Only Wanna Be with You : Samantha Fox (Originally a #4 hit for Dusty Springfield in 1963)
I Haven't Stopped Dancing Yet : Pat & Mick (A Top 10 hit for The Gonzalas)
S.S. Paparazzi (The Boys Have A Go Back Mix) : Stock Aitken Waterman
Wrap My Arms Around You : Jason Donovan (B Side to "Too Many Broken Hearts")
Ferry 'Cross the Mersey : Various (Originally recorded by Gerry & The Pacemakers)

Disc two

Pumping Party Mix One (17.43)
Turn It Into Love : Hazell Dean
Take Me To Your Heart : Rick Astley
Made in Heaven : Kylie Minogue
I Only Wanna Be with You : Samantha Fox

Pumping Party Mix Two (24.22)
I'd Rather Jack : Reynolds Girls
S.S. Paparazzi : Stock Aitken Waterman
He Ain't No Competition : Brother Beyond
I Haven't Stopped Dancing Yet : Pat & Mick
Help! : Bananarama

The video compilation included all the above tracks with the exception of Jason Donovan Wrap My Arms Around You, of which no video was made. An exclusive was Kylie Minogue Made in Heaven. Due to be a double A side with Je Ne Sais Pas Pourquoi but decided against at the last minute.

See also
Mike Stock
List of songs that were written or produced by SAW (in chronological order, including US and UK chart positions)
The Hit Factory : The Best of Stock Aitken Waterman. (1987 UK compilation album released by Stylus Records).
The Hit Factory Volume 2. (1988 compilation album released by Fanfare Records and PWL Records.)
A Ton Of Hits : The Very Best of Stock Aitken Waterman. (1990 compilation released by Chrysalis Records, trading as Dover Records.)
The Hit Factory : Pete Waterman's Greatest Hits. (2000 compilation issued by Universal Music.)
Stock Aitken Waterman Gold. (2005 compilation released by PWL Records in association with Sony BMG).

External links
Mike Stock 

1989 compilation albums
Albums produced by Stock Aitken Waterman
Pop compilation albums